Cheerleader is an American indie pop band from Philadelphia, Pennsylvania, United States.  Formed in 2012, the band signed in 2013 to Bright Antenna Records and have so far released a 7" single, "Perfect Vision"/"Waiting Waiting," in the United Kingdom, the On Your Side EP in the United States, an LP, The Sunshine of Your Youth, released May 19, 2015, and a single, "Bang, Bang," in the United States, on May 30, 2019.

History
The band was formed in 2012 in Connecticut by schoolmates Joe Haller and Chris Duran. When the duo moved to Philadelphia in 2013 they began to produce and release demos on SoundCloud which drew attention from the likes of NME and Nylon. The group expanded to a five-piece with the addition of Paul Impellizeri, Josh Pannepacker and Carl Bahner. After a year of tours which included the festivals CMJ, the NME stage at Great Escape and SXSW, the band signed to Bright Antenna Records in 2013 where they have released two singles, an EP and their debut LP entitled The Sunshine of Your Youth. Their next album, Almost Forever, was released in 2020.

In early 2021, Cheerleader released an album of demos written between the two studio albums, Demos 2016-2018, and announced their retirement.

Band members

Current
Joe Haller – vocals, guitar
Paul Impellizeri – bass guitar, vocals
Josh Pannepacker – keys, guitar
Sean Donaghy - drums

Former
Carl Bahner – drums
Chris Duran – lead guitar

Discography

Extended plays
On Your Side (Bright Antenna, October 7, 2014)

Studio albums
The Sunshine of Your Youth (Bright Antenna, May 19, 2015)
Almost Forever (Bright Antenna, February 7, 2020)

Singles
"Perfect Vision" / "Waiting Waiting" (Bright Antenna/Young And Lost Club, April 28, 2014)
"Bang, Bang" (Bright Antenna, May 30, 2019)

References

External links

Musical groups from Philadelphia
Bright Antenna Records artists